Several of the forts surrounding Plymouth were built as a result of a decision in Lord Palmerston's premiership to deter the French from attacking naval bases in the south of the country. The Royal Commission on the Defence of the United Kingdom reported in 1860 and resulted in a huge building programme. Examples of the forts are:

 Agaton Fort
Fort Austin
Fort Bovisand
 Bowden Fort
Brownhill Battery
Cawsand Fort
 Crownhill Fort
 Drake's Island Battery
 Egg Buckland Keep
 Ernesettle Fort
 Fort Efford
Forder Battery
Hawkins Battery
Knowles Battery
Laira Battery
Mount Edgcumbe Garden Battery
Penlee Battery
Picklecombe Fort
Plymouth Breakwater Fort
Polhawn Battery
Raleigh Battery
Fort Scraesdon
Staddon Fort
Stamford Fort
Fort Tregantle
Watch House Battery
 Whitesand Bay Battery
 Woodlands Fort

References
 Woodward, F. W. (1998) Forts or Follies.  Devon Books, 1998; Barbarossa Books
 Plymouth City website 

 
Forts in Cornwall
Forts in Devon
Plymouth
Forts